Gazette of Tamil Nadu is a public journal of the Government of Tamil Nadu, published weekly by the Department of Stationery and Printing. As a public journal, the Gazette prints official notices from the government. The gazette is printed by the Government of Tamil Nadu Press.

History
Gazette of Tamil Nadu was formerly known as The Fort St. George Gazette, Madras during the years 1832–1967. From 1967 it was known as Gazette of Tamil Nadu.

Types 

 Tamil Nadu Government Gazette
 Tamil Nadu Government Gazette Extraordinary

Work 

The Department of Stationery and Printing is headed by the Director of Stationery and Printing with the other senior Government officers. The gazette employs more than 1646 people under the supervision of the Department of Stationary and Printing (Tamil Nadu).

See also
 Gazette
 Government of Tamil Nadu
 Department of Law (Tamil Nadu)
 Tamil Nadu Government Laws & Rules
 The Gazette of India
 Constitution of India

References

External links
 The Gazette of Tamil Nadu
 Tamil Nadu Government Gazette Extraordinary
 Department of Stationery and Printing
 Government of Tamil Nadu
 http://www.lawnotes.in/Tamil_Nadu_Acts  LawNotes.in 
  http://www.lawsofindia.org/state/26/Tamil%20Nadu.html  laws of india.org

Tamil Nadu state legislation
Government of Tamil Nadu
India, Gazette of

ta:இந்திய அரசிதழ்